Diceratocephalidae is an family of trilobites belonging to the order Ptychopariida.

Genera:
 Cyclolorenzella
 Diceratocephalus
 Fenghuangella 
 Tholifrons 
 Trigocephalus

References

Ptychopariida
Trilobite families